Dame Rosanne Philippa Meo  (née O'Loghlen; born 1945/1946) is a New Zealand businesswoman based in Auckland.

In 1991, she was the first female president of the Employers' Federation. She sits or has sat on the boards of NZ Forest Products, Television New Zealand, Mercury Energy, Sky TV, Ports of Auckland, and Baycorp.

Personal life
Meo was educated at Baradene College of the Sacred Heart, Auckland. She has two daughters and was divorced in the early 1990s. Meo is the aunt of former All Blacks captain, Sean Fitzpatrick.

Honours and awards
In the 1993 Queen's Birthday Honours, Meo was appointed an Officer of the Order of the British Empire, for services to business management. Also in 1993, she was awarded the New Zealand Suffrage Centennial Medal.

She was made a Dame Companion of the New Zealand Order of Merit, for services to business, in the 2012 New Year Honours.

In 2016, Meo received the New Zealand Women of Influence Award for lifetime achievement.

References

1940s births
Living people
People from Auckland
New Zealand women in business
Date of birth missing (living people)
Place of birth missing (living people)
New Zealand Officers of the Order of the British Empire
Dames Companion of the New Zealand Order of Merit
New Zealand Women of Influence Award recipients
People educated at Baradene College of the Sacred Heart
New Zealand people of Irish descent
Recipients of the New Zealand Suffrage Centennial Medal 1993